Mrs Miniver is a 1960 TV adaptation of the novel Mrs. Miniver.

Plot summary

Cast
 Maureen O'Hara as Mrs. Miniver
 Leo Genn as Clem Miniver
 Juliet Mills as Carol Beldon
 Cathleen Nesbitt as Lady Beldon
 Keir Dullea as German Pilot
 Peter Lazer as Toby Miniver
 Joan Terrace as Judy Miniver

Production
The show rehearsed for three weeks.

References

External links
 Mrs Miniver at BFI
 

1960 television films
1960 films
1960s English-language films